The Perl Cookbook, is a book containing solutions to common short tasks in Perl.  Each chapter covers a particular topic area ("Strings", "Ties, Objects, and Classes", "CGI") and is divided into around a dozen recipes each on a particular problem ("Reversing A String By Word Or Character", "Accessing Overridden Methods", "Managing Cookies").  Each recipe has four parts: "Problem", "Solution", "Discussion", and "See Also".

The Perl Cookbook is written by Tom Christiansen and Nathan Torkington, and published by O'Reilly.  The Perl Cookbook inspired the PLEAC (Programming Language Examples Alike Cookbook) website, which translated the code snippets in the Perl Cookbook into other languages: Python, Ruby, Guile, Tcl, Java, and beyond.  O'Reilly went on to publish other Cookbooks inspired by the Perl Cookbook's format, including Java Cookbook, Python Cookbook, CSS Cookbook, and PHP Cookbook.

Some related books are Learning Perl and Advanced Perl Programming.

Reception 
The Perl Cookbook has been referred to as "the definitive Perl book", "the ultimate Perl Grabbag", and "an essential book for the advanced development of Perl skills".

Editions 
 First edition (1998; 794 pages)
 Second edition (2003; 964 pages)

References

External links
O'Reilly Online Catalog: Perl Cookbook
O'Reilly Online Catalog: Perl Cookbook, 2nd edition
PLEAC home page

1998 non-fiction books
2003 non-fiction books
O'Reilly Media books
Books about Perl